Giampaolo da Pisa or Pietro Paolo de Thisis (died 1554) was a Roman Catholic prelate who served as Bishop of Acerra (1539–1554).

Biography
On 21 April 1539, Giampaolo da Pisa was appointed during the papacy of Pope Paul III as Bishop of Acerra.
On 4 April 1540, he was consecrated bishop by Alfonso Oliva, Bishop of Bovino. 
He served as Bishop of Acerra until his death in 1554.

References

External links and additional sources
 (for Chronology of Bishops) 
 (for Chronology of Bishops) 

16th-century Italian Roman Catholic bishops
Bishops appointed by Pope Paul III
1554 deaths